Chulumani Municipality or Villa de la Libertad Municipality is the first municipal section of the Sud Yungas Province in the  La Paz Department, Bolivia. Its seat is Chulumani.

Cantons  
Chulumani Municipality is divided into five cantons.

References

External links 
 Population data and map of Chulumani Municipality

Municipalities of La Paz Department (Bolivia)